Adriaan de Lelie (19 May  1755 – 30 November 1820) was a Dutch painter.

He was born in Tilburg.

De Lelie was a pupil of A. Peeters, a painter of tapestries and ornaments, and afterwards of Andreas Bernardus de Quertenmont in Antwerp. He made copies of many portraits by Rubens and van Dyck in Düsseldorf, and also of historical pictures by Italian and Dutch masters. On the advice of Professor Camper, he established himself in Amsterdam.

He painted a great number of portraits and cabinet pictures.  The latter includes one of the celebrated art lover Jan Gildemeester in the act of showing his collection to a party of ladies and gentlemen.  One of his best works is that of the 'Drawing Academy' of the Felix Meritis Society in Amsterdam. His pictures are highly esteemed in the Netherlands and Germany, where they can be found in distinguished collections.

His pupils were Jean Augustin Daiwaille, Jan Adriaan Antonie de Lelie, François Montauban van Swijndregt, Pièrre Recco, Izaak Riewert Schmidt, and Johannes Ziesenis.

He died in Amsterdam.

References

Attribution:
 

1755 births
1820 deaths
Dutch painters
Dutch male painters
People from Tilburg